Central City Sketches is an album by saxophonist/composer Benny Carter recorded in 1987 and released by the MusicMasters label as a double LP.

Reception

AllMusic reviewer Scott Yanow stated "One of the many Benny Carter recordings cut after he returned to jazz on a full-time basis in the mid-'70s, this double-LP set is the jewel among the seemingly countless number of gems ... as is often the case, Benny Carter frequently steals solo honors and his brief trumpet spot on "Central City Blues" is memorable".

Track listing
All compositions by Benny Carter except where noted
 "Doozy (Second Version)" – 5:20
 "When Lights Are Low" – 5:00
 "A Kiss from You" – 2:53
 "Sleep" (Earl Burtnett, Adam Geibel) – 3:26
 "Central City Sketches: Central City Blues" – 3:08
 "Central City Sketches: Hello" – 4:14
 "Central City Sketches: People" – 4:22
 "Central City Sketches: Promenade" – 3:18
 "Central City Sketches: Remember" – 3:34
 "Central City Sketches: Sky Dance" – 3:28
 "Lonesome Nights" – 5:07
 "Doozy (First Version)" – 4:39
 "Easy Money" – 7:00
 "Symphony in Riffs" – 4:37
 "Souvenir" – 4:03
 "Blues in My Heart" – 7:00

Personnel 
Benny Carter – alto saxophone, trumpet, arranger, conductor
The American Jazz Orchestra 
John Eckert, Marvin Stamm, Bob Millikan, Virgil Jones – trumpet
Britt Woodman, Eddie Bert, Jack Jeffers, Jimmy Knepper – trombone
Bill Easley, John Purcell – alto saxophone, flute
Lew Tabackin – tenor saxophone, flute
Loren Schoenberg – tenor saxophone
Danny Bank – baritone saxophone, bass clarinet
Remo Palmier – guitar
John Lewis – piano, musical director
Dick Katz – piano (tracks 1, 3, 5-10 & 12-15)
Ron Carter – bass
Mel Lewis – drums

References 

1987 albums
Benny Carter albums
American Jazz Orchestra albums
MusicMasters Records albums